This is a list of rulers and office-holders of Germany.

Heads of state
Presidents of Germany
List of German presidents since 1919
List of German monarchs
German rulers in 1874
German rulers in 1875
German rulers in 1876
German rulers in 1877
German rulers in 1878
German rulers in 1879
German rulers in 1904

Heads of government
Chancellors of Germany
Deputy and Vice-Chancellors

Ministers
Foreign ministers
Interior ministers
Finance ministers
Justice ministers
Postal ministers
Colonial ministers
Naval ministers
Defence ministers
Economics ministers
Agriculture ministers
Labour ministers
Transportation ministers
Treasury Minister of Germany
Reconstruction Minister of Germany
Occupied Territories Minister of Germany
Propaganda Minister of Germany
Aviation Minister of Germany
Science Minister of Germany
Education Minister of Germany
Ecclesiastical Affairs Minister of Germany
Munitions Minister of Germany
Occupied Eastern Territories Minister of Germany
Construction Minister of Germany
Family Affairs Minister of Germany
Women and Youth Minister of Germany
Health Minister of Germany
Economic Cooperation Minister of Germany
Environment Minister of Germany

Heads of former states

Federal Republic of Germany
Ministers of the Federal Republic of Germany

German Democratic Republic
Leadership of East Germany

Holy Roman Empire
List of Holy Roman Emperors

Prussia
Kings of Prussia
Prime Ministers of Prussia
Deputy Prime Ministers of Prussia
Foreign Ministers of Prussia
Interior Ministers of Prussia
War Ministers of Prussia

Princely states
Kingdom of Hanover and Province of Hanover
Rulers of Bavaria
Counts Palatine of the Rhine and Electors Palatine
Rulers of Württemberg
Rulers of Saxony
Rulers of Baden
Rulers of Hesse
Counts, Princes of Hohenzollern-Sigmaringen
Rulers of Mecklenburg
Counts, Princes of Reuss
Margrave of Ansbach
Counts, Princes, and Dukes of Arenberg
Counts and dukes of Bar
Margrave of Bayreuth
Counts of Bentheim
Counts of Bentheim-Alpen
Counts of Bentheim-Bentheim
Counts of Bentheim-Limburg
Counts of Bentheim-Lingen
Counts of Bentheim-Steinfurt
Counts of Bentheim-Tecklenburg
Counts of Bentheim-Tecklenburg-Rheda
Electors of Brandenburg, see: List of rulers of Brandenburg and Hohenzollern
Dukes of Brunswick-Lüneburg
Counts of Castell
Counts of Castell-Castell
Counts of Castell-Rüdenhausen
Counts of Celje
Dukes of Cleves, see Duchy of Cleves
Counts and Princes of East Frisia
Counts of Fürstenberg
Counts of Fürstenberg-Baar
Counts of Fürstenberg-Blumberg
Counts of Fürstenberg-Donaueschingen
Counts of Fürstenberg-Fürstenberg
Princes of Fürstenberg-Fürstenberg
Counts of Fürstenberg-Geisingen
Counts of Fürstenberg-Heiligenberg
Princes of Fürstenberg-Heiligenberg
Counts of Fürstenberg-Möhringen
Counts of Fürstenberg-Messkirch
Princes of Fürstenberg-Messkirch
Princes of Fürstenberg-Pürglitz
Counts of Fürstenberg-Stühlingen
Counts of Fürstenberg-Taikowitz
Counts of Fürstenberg-Weitra
Counts of Fürstenberg-Wolfach
Counts, Princes of Hohenzollern-Hechingen
Counts, Princes of Hohenzollern-Sigmaringen
Dukes of Holstein-Gottorp
Princes of Klingenberg
Dukes of Krumau
Prince of Liechtenstein
Lords, Counts and Princes of Lippe
Dukes, Grand Dukes of Mecklenburg-Schwerin
Dukes, Grand Dukes of Mecklenburg-Strelitz
List of Margraves of Meißen
Counts of Nassau
Burgrave of Nuremberg
Rulers of Oldenburg
Counts of Ortenburg-Neuortenburg
Counts of Öttingen-Öttingen
Dukes of Pomerania
Palatinate-Simmern
Counts Palatine of Zweibrücken
Dukes and Kings of Prussia, see List of rulers of Prussia
Counts, Princes of Reuss
Counts of Salm
Counts of Salm-Horstmar
Wildgraves, Rhinegraves, Princes of Salm-Kyrburg
Counts of Salm-Reifferscheid-Dyck
Counts of Salm-Reifferscheid-Hainsbach
Counts, Princes of Salm-Reifferscheid-Krautheim
Counts of Salm-Reifferscheid-Raitz
Counts, Princes of Salm-Salm
Counts of Sayn-Berleburg
Counts of Sayn-Wittgenstein-Hohnstein
Dukes of Saxe-Coburg and Gotha
List of rulers of Schleswig-Holstein
Counts of Schönborn-Wiesentheid
Counts of Solms-Braunfels
Counts of Solms-Hohensolms-Lich
Counts of Solms-Laubach
Counts of Solms-Rödelheim-Assenheim
Counts of Solms-Wildenfels
Counts of Stadion-Thannhausen
Counts of Stadion-Warthausen
Counts of Stolberg-Stolberg
Counts of Stolberg-Wernigerode
Dukes of Swabia
Princes of Thurn und Taxis
Rulers of Thuringia
Counts of Toggenburg
Counts of Veldenz
Counts of Waldburg-Waldsee
Counts of Waldburg-Wurzach
Counts of Waldburg-Zeil
Princes of Waldeck

Barbarian States
Hasdingii rulers, see Vandal
Visigothic rulers, see Visigoth
Suevi rulers, see Suevi or Kingdom of Galicia
Ostrogothic rulers, see Ostrogoth

State office-holders
German Field Marshals

Heads of subdivisions

Minister-Presidents of Baden-Württemberg
Ministers-President of Bavaria
Mayors of Berlin
Minister-Presidents of Brandenburg
Mayors of Bremen
Mayors of Hamburg
Minister-Presidents of Hesse
Minister-Presidents of Mecklenburg-Vorpommern
Minister-Presidents of Lower Saxony
Minister-Presidents of North Rhine-Westphalia
Minister-Presidents of Rhineland-Palatinate
Minister-Presidents of Saarland
Minister-Presidents of Saxony
Minister-Presidents of Saxony-Anhalt
Minister-Presidents of Schleswig-Holstein
Minister-Presidents of Thuringia

See also
Lists of office-holders

Lists of European rulers